The Pankhos, are a community inhabiting the Chittagong Hill Tracts of Bangladesh and also in India with a population of only 3,227 in Bangladesh according to the 1991 census. In the 1981 census they were 2440 in number. In Bangladesh, the Pankhos live in Barkal in Rangamati Hill District close to Mizoram.

The Luseis and Pankhos belong to the Kuki-chin-mizo group of people. The Lushai Hills, which is now part of Mizoram, is their original homeland. Though the Luseis and Pankhos are identified as separate tribes, they are culturally very close to each other. Though the Luseis do not understand Pankho language, the latter understand the Lusei language. Both the tribes are known for their bravery, honesty and truthfulness.

Religion and culture
The Pankhos adopted Christianity during the British period and have adopted western dress and culture.

References

Ethnic groups in Bangladesh